The Right Reverend Juan David Alvarado (in Spanish usage, Juan David Alvarado Melgar) is an El Salvador Anglican bishop. He became head of the Anglican-Episcopal Church of El Salvador in 2015, succeeding Martín Barahona.

References

Anglican bishops of El Salvador
Living people
Year of birth missing (living people)